Puncturella pileolus is a species of sea snail, a marine gastropod mollusk in the family Fissurellidae, the keyhole limpets and slit limpets.

The Latin word "pileolus" (masculine diminutive of "pileus") means "felt cap".

Description
The size of the shell varies between 2 mm and 4.5 mm. This species is smaller than Cranopsis pelex, A. Adams, and is laterally compressed. The vertex is subspiral, and posteriorly deflexed so as to reach the hinder margin. The interstices of the radiating ribs or lirae are crossed by transverse or concentric bars placed close together, so as to produce a narrowly clathrate style of sculpture. Many specimens were obtained, all of the same size and character, in company with young and old specimens of Emarginula. When in the young state, the fissure extends as far as the front edge. And  when very young, these shells resemble, in respect of the emarginate aperture, species of Emarginula.

Distribution
This marine species occurs off the Philippines and Korea.

References

 Poppe G.T. & Tagaro S.P. (2020). The Fissurellidae from the Philippines with the description of 26 new species. Visaya. suppl. 13: 1-131

External links
 Adams A. (1860). Mollusca Japonica: New species of Aclis, Ebala, Dunkeria, &c. Annals and Magazine of Natural History. ser. 3, 6: 118-121
 Cunha T.J., Lemer S., Bouchet P., Kano Y. & Giribet G. (2019). Putting keyhole limpets on the map: phylogeny and biogeography of the globally distributed marine family Fissurellidae (Vetigastropoda, Mollusca). Molecular Phylogenetics and Evolution. 135: 249-269
 To Biodiversity Heritage Library (6 publications)
 To World Register of Marine Species
 

Fissurellidae
Gastropods described in 1860